Santosh Pol (born November 4, 1974)  is an Indian quack doctor who confessed to killing six people from 2003 to 2016 in the town of Dhom, Maharashtra, allegedly by injecting them with succinylcholine, a neuro-muscular paralytic drug. He was dubbed Dr. Death by the media for the incident.

The names of his victims are Mangala Jedhe, Salma Shaikh, Jagabai Pol, Surekha Chikane, Vanita Gaikwad and Nathmal Bhandari.

In popular culture
In the 2020 Marathi television series Devmanus, Kiran Gaikwad's character called Dr. Ajitkumar Dev is mainly based on Santosh Pol's life.

See also
List of serial killers by country

References

1974 births
Indian serial killers
Male serial killers
Medical serial killers
Living people
Poisoners
Medical doctors from Maharashtra
People from Satara district
Indian people convicted of murder
Prisoners and detainees of Maharashtra
Criminals from Maharashtra